Glenea (Parazosne) estanleyi is a species of beetle in the family Cerambycidae. It was described by Vives in 2009. It is known from the Philippines.

References

estanleyi
Beetles described in 2009